Arthur Needham (February 5, 1859 – August 29, 1915) was a Washington State pioneer, haberdasher, and politician. When Shelton was incorporated as a city in 1890, Needham was among the five councilmen of the new City Council. He ran for mayor in 1898 as the Democratic nominee, but lost to the Republican candidate.

Needham started his time in Washington State by working in the lumber business. For a number of years, he worked as a cruiser, researching the quality of forests for lumber purchasers. Later, he combined his cruiser duties with the position of Superintendent of Building and Operating for the Peninsular Railroad Company. As a pioneer of Shelton, Needham entered the clothing business. He invested his savings into his own men's clothing store and founded the Needham Mercantile Company. He was the first haberdasher (men's clothing retailer) in Mason County.

Needham was an active member of popular fraternities, such as the Odd Fellows, the Ancient Order of United Workmen, the Fraternal Order of Eagles, and others.

Early life and education

Needham was born on February 5, 1859, in Sheffield, England. He was brought to America at the age of nine, and lived with friends of the family in Saginaw, Michigan. He grew up and was educated there.

Career

Lumbering business and Peninsular Railroad Company

Needham came to Washington State in 1883, when the lumber business was popular, and a vast array of men were employed in its different branches. Growing up in Saginaw, the city considered the "center of a large lumbering industry," Needham was interested in logging. In Washington, he started to work as a cruiser, or estimator, his job being to investigate forests and closely study their qualities to provide information to lumber purchasers. He became an expert in this field.

Needham worked as an assistant manager at Satsop Railroad, which became a part of the Peninsular Railroad Company in 1889. After working five years for the company, he was made Superintendent of Building and Operating, combining that position with his job as a cruiser.

Clothing business

As a cruiser and superintendent in the Peninsular Railroad Company, Needham received what was judged to be "good wages," and later was able to invest into a mercantile business. He opened his own store in Shelton, becoming the first haberdasher in the city and county. In 1909, Needham founded a corporation named the Needham Mercantile Company in collaboration with his wife Ida and partner C. E. Barnard. Needham supplied his male customers with hats, caps, shoes and other necessary items. In the adjoining store, Needham's wife sold women's hats. Over the years, the Needhams "built up an excellent business" and made a vast array of friends in the city.

Political activity

On May 17, 1890, Shelton was incorporated as a town, and Needham became one of the new five-member City Council.

In 1898, Needham was the Democratic nominee for the position of mayor, but lost the election to the Republican L. J. Morrison by seventeen votes.

Other activity and retirement

During the Klondike Gold Rush in 1897, Needham visited the departure point for gold diggers in Dyea, Alaska. However, he soon returned home due to "severe hardships."

In later years, Needham suffered from blindness and was forced to retire.

Memberships

Needham was an active member of several fraternities, or what were known as the "most prominent secret societies." He was a member of the Odd Fellows, the Knights of the Maccabees, the Yeomen, the Woodmen of the World, the Ancient Order of United Workmen, and the Fraternal Order of Eagles.

Personal life and death

Needham married Ida Day in 1888. They had five children: Arthur, Ida, Maurice, Elva Rowena and Earl Needham. The family lived in their home in Shelton, Washington.

Needham died on August 29, 1915 in his home in Shelton.

See also 
 Saginaw, Michigan
 Haberdasher

References

Literature cited

External links 
 The history of Shelton city incorporation
 

Washington (state) pioneers
People from Shelton, Washington
19th-century American merchants
Haberdashers
Businesspeople in timber
1859 births
1915 deaths